La Grande Sfida is a women's exhibition tennis tournament held at the Mediolanum Forum and hosted by the Boscolo Hotel in Milan (for the first two editions). The first edition was held on 3 December, 2011. The second edition was held on 1 December, 2012. The third edition was held on 17 in Genoa and 18 October in Milan, 2014. The fourth edition will be held on 20 in Verona and 22 November in Modena, 2015.

2011 La Grande Sfida
The inaugural event this year featured the Williams sisters as well as 2010 French Open champion Francesca Schiavone and 2011 US Open quarter-finalist Flavia Pennetta.

Players

Matches

2012 La Grande Sfida
The 2012 edition was held on December 1, 2012, in Milan, Italy. This year's players featured French Open finalists Sara Errani and Maria Sharapova as well as US Open quarter-finalists Roberta Vinci and Ana Ivanovic.

The first match, between Ana Ivanovic and Roberta Vinci, was a repeat of their second round match from the Rogers Cup earlier in the year in which Vinci won 6–0, 6–0. However, this time Ivanovic would gain her revenge, winning in a 12-point tiebreak.

The second match, between Maria Sharapova and Sara Errani, was a repeat of their French Open final in which Sharapova won to complete a Career Grand Slam. Sharapova was once again victorious, by a scoreline of 6–2.

The Italians would then gain their revenge over Ivanovic and Sharapova by scoring a 6–4 victory in the doubles rubber.

Players

Matches

2014 La Grande Sfida
The 2014 edition was held on 17 October 2014 in Genoa and on 18 October 2014 in Milan, Italy. The event featured four legends of the ATP Champions Tour: the 8-time Grand Slam champion Ivan Lendl, Wimbledon champion Goran Ivanišević, French Open champion Michael Chang and 7-time Grand Slam champion John McEnroe.

The semifinals were held in Genoa, while the final and the 3rd place final were played the day after in Milan.

Players

Draw

2015 La Grande Sfida
The 2015 edition was held on 20 November 2015 in Verona and 22 November 2015 in Modena, Italy. The event featured 4 legends of the ATP Champions Tour: the 7-time Grand Slam champion Mats Wilander, French Open champion Sergi Bruguera, French Open finalist Henri Leconte and 7-time Grand Slam champion John McEnroe.

Players

Draw

2016 La Grande Sfida
The 2016 edition was held from 19 to 20 November 2015 in Bari, Italy. The event featured 4 legends of the ATP Champions Tour: the 7-time Grand Slam champion John McEnroe, French Open finalist Henri Leconte, Australian Open finalist Thomas Enqvist and French Open champion Thomas Muster.

Thomas Enqvist won the title by defeating John McEnroe 6–2, 7–6(7–5) in the final.

Players

Draw

References

External links

Tennis tournaments in Italy
Exhibition tennis tournaments
2011 establishments in Italy
Recurring sporting events established in 2011
Sport in Milan